Richard Ludlow is an American video game audio director, sound designer, music producer, and voice director, best known for his work on Disney Infinity, King's Quest, Ring of Elysium and Arena of Valor. He is the founder and co-owner of Hexany Audio. Ludlow was named on the Forbes 30 Under 30 list of 2019 under the Games category.

Ludlow attended Fountain Valley High School in Fountain Valley, California. He studied electronic production and design (EPD) at Berklee College of Music In 2012, Ludlow founded Hexany Audio with three friends at Berklee.

Career 
Ludlow is the co-owner and audio director at Hexany Audio, which has audio credits for PlayerUnknown’s Battlegrounds, H1Z1, Arena of Valor, King’s Quest 2015, Ring of Elysium, Into the Stars, Blade Runner: Revelations (VR)., audio producer on film and television projects, including The Cold Light of Day, The Raven, and projects for Fortune 500 brands such as Disney, Coca-Cola, Activision, and Nike.

Ludlow has presented talks on audio for video games at GDC, GDC Europe, GDC Next, GameSoundCon, PAX East, PAX Dev, IndieCade, Gamescom, Casual Connect, the External Development Summit, the Midwest Game Developers Summit, Sigma Play, the Silicon Valley Virtual Reality Expo, MIT, WonderCon, and Berklee College of Music.

Ludlow was nominated for a Hollywood Music in Media Award for Original Score in a Video Game for his work on Moonlight Blade: Moonlight Over the Sea.

Filmography

Video games

Film

References

External links
 Hexany Audio Credits List

Living people
Audio directors
American sound designers
American voice directors
Video game composers
21st-century American composers
Berklee College of Music alumni
Year of birth missing (living people)